Alexander C. Wagenaar is professor of health outcomes and policy at the University of Florida College of Medicine, where he also serves on the graduate faculty.

Education
Wagenaar received his B.A. in sociology from Calvin College and his M.S.W. (in Program Evaluation and Research) and Ph.D. (in Health Behavior) from the University of Michigan.

Career
Wagenaar worked at the University of Michigan as a research scientist from 1980 to 1989. From 1989 to 1990, he worked as a visiting scholar at the Marin Institute for the Prevention of Alcohol and Other Drug Problems. From 1990 until 2004, he was a faculty member at the University of Minnesota.

Research
Wagenaar is known for his research into the beneficial effects of alcohol laws, particularly alcohol taxes. He has also studied the effects of raising the legal drinking age in the United States to 21 on alcohol consumption.

Awards and honors
In 1999, Wagenaar received the Jellinek Award for research on alcohol. In 2001, he received the Innovator's Award from the Robert Wood Johnson Foundation. In 2004, he was named an ISI highly cited researcher.

References

Living people
University of Florida faculty
Calvin University alumni
University of Michigan School of Social Work alumni
Researchers in alcohol abuse
American epidemiologists
Year of birth missing (living people)